Kim Seon-il, sometimes spelled as Kim Sun-il (born 11 June 1985) is a South Korean football defender.

Playing as central defender, or left-back, he came to Serbia in summer 2011 after having played with Suwon Samsung Bluewings in the K-League and winning the 2010 Korean FA Cup with them.

Kim Seon-il played with Dongguk University in 2008 before moving to Bluewings at the end of the year.

He made his league debut with FK Radnički Niš on October 1, 2011, in a Serbian First League round 8 match against FK Donji Srem.

He is a former member of the South Korea national under-20 football team.

Honours
Samsung Bluewings
Korean FA Cup: 2009, 2010

References

External sources
 Kim Seon-il at Srbijafudbal
 

1985 births
Living people
South Korean footballers
South Korean expatriate footballers
Association football defenders
Suwon Samsung Bluewings players
FK Radnički Niš players
K League 1 players
Serbian First League players
Expatriate footballers in Serbia
South Korean expatriate sportspeople in Serbia
Dongguk University alumni
People from Gochang County
Sportspeople from North Jeolla Province